Zitadelle ("Citadel") may refer to:
Spandau Citadel (German: Zitadelle Spandau), a fortress in Berlin
Zitadelle (Berlin U-Bahn), a railway station serving the Spandau Citadel
Zitadelle Mainz, a fortress in Mainz
Operation Zitadelle, the German offensive operation for the Battle of Kursk